Istanbul is the name of two brands of cymbals, Istanbul Agop and Istanbul Mehmet, made in Istanbul using traditional cymbal making methods. Another product range of the Agop factory is Istanbul Alchemy. 

Cymbals have been made in Istanbul for centuries, most notably K.Zildjian Istanbul cymbals (up until the late 1970s). 

Mehmet Tamdeger and Agop Tomurcuk trained Ibrahim Yakici, Hasan Seker, and Hasan Ozdemir, who would eventually be the founders of Bosphorus Cymbals.

See also
Cymbal manufacturers

References

External links
Istanbul Agop
Istanbul Mehmet
Alchemy Cymbals
Mehmet Tamdeger Interview NAMM Oral History Library (2006)
Cymbal manufacturing companies
Musical instrument manufacturing companies of Turkey